Cameron Peter Devlin (born 7 June 1998) is an Australian professional footballer who plays as a defensive midfielder for Heart of Midlothian and the Australia national team.

Club career

Sydney FC
After being part of Sydney FC NPL team, Devlin got a call up to play for Sydney FC in the 2018–19 A-League season, making seven appearances off the bench including an AFC Champions League appearance against Kawasaki Frontale. He scored his first professional goal on 1 March 2019 in a 2–0 win over Adelaide.

Wellington Phoenix
On 4 July 2019, Devlin signed a two-year deal with the Wellington Phoenix after turning down a contract to stay with Sydney. In his first few months, Devlin only made sporadic appearances off the bench alongside two appearances for the reserve team.

On 14 December 2019, following an injury to regular midfielder Alex Rufer, Devlin made his starting debut for the Phoenix in a 0–0 draw with Melbourne Victory; he quickly became an integral player for the team, being named A-League Player of the Month for December and retaining his starting spot even when Rufer recovered.

Hearts
On 28 June 2021, it was announced that Devlin had signed a two-year deal with the Newcastle Jets. However, by August 2021 a transfer fee had been agreed with the Jets for Devlin to join Scottish Premiership club Heart of Midlothian, subject to the player securing a United Kingdom visa, which he did on 24 August.

International career

Youth
In October 2015, Devlin was selected for the Australia under-20 team to play in 2016 AFC U-19 Championship qualification. He made his youth international debut on 4 October 2015, playing in a win over Laos.

Devlin was initially named as a reserve players for the Australian under-23 side at the 2020 Olympics in Tokyo. He was added to the Australian Olympic squad after the International Olympic Committee expanded squad sizes for the tournament.

Devlin made one appearance at the 2020 Olympic Games, coming on as a late substitute as Australia lost 2–0 to Egypt.

Senior
Devlin was called up to the Australian senior side for the first time in September 2022 for two friendly matches against New Zealand in the leadup to the 2022 FIFA World Cup. He came on for his senior international debut as a second-half substitute in the second game on 25 September 2022, in Auckland.

On 8 November 2022, it was announced that Devlin was included in the Australian squad for the 2022 FIFA World Cup in Qatar. Devlin did not take the field in the tournament for Australia, who were eliminated by Argentina in the round of sixteen.

Career statistics

Honours
Sydney FC
 A-League Championship: 2019
 FFA Cup runner-up: 2018

References

External links

1998 births
Living people
Australian soccer players
National Premier Leagues players
Association football midfielders
Sydney FC players
Wellington Phoenix FC players
Newcastle Jets FC players
Heart of Midlothian F.C. players
Footballers at the 2020 Summer Olympics
2022 FIFA World Cup players
Olympic soccer players of Australia
Australian expatriate soccer players
Expatriate footballers in Scotland
Australian expatriate sportspeople in Scotland
Australia international soccer players